Dmitri Sayustov (born February 13, 1988) is a Russian professional ice hockey centre who currently plays for Admiral Vladivostok of the Kontinental Hockey League (KHL). He has previously played with Torpedo Nizhny Novgorod, HC CSKA Moscow, Traktor Chelyabinsk, Salavat Yulaev Ufa and HC Sibir Novosibirsk.

References

External links

1988 births
Living people
Admiral Vladivostok players
HC CSKA Moscow players
Salavat Yulaev Ufa players
HC Sibir Novosibirsk players
Torpedo Nizhny Novgorod players
Traktor Chelyabinsk players
Russian ice hockey centres